Candidatus realium or candidata realium (abbreviated cand. real.) is a former academic degree used in Norway, and conferred in mathematics and natural sciences. It was abolished in 1985. There was originally no set duration for the completion of this degree, although 7–8 years was normal, and including a dissertation which usually took between 2 and 4 years to complete. As of 1985, the formal requirement amounted to 6 years of studies and dissertation work, although there was a strong tradition for extensive dissertations, leading many students to take longer. The degree is sometimes translated as PhD.

References

Academic degrees of Norway
Scandinavian titles